The fourth season of America's Next Top Model aired in spring 2005, with the shooting location being moved from New York City to Los Angeles. The catchphrase of the season was "Dive In."

These were the last appearances of Janice Dickinson and Nolé Marin as judges and the Beauty Tip of the Week was replaced by the My Life as a CoverGirl segment. The house that the girls stayed in the first half of the competition was later used in The CW TV series (successor to UPN with the WB) The Pussycat Dolls Present: Girlicious and the  Oxygen TV series Pretty Wicked.

The international destination for the cycle was Cape Town, South Africa, the show’s first visit to Africa and only visit to Southern Africa. 

The winner was 20-year-old Naima Mora from Detroit, Michigan with Kahlen Rondot placing as the runner up.

The prizes for this cycle were a modeling contract with Ford Models, a fashion spread and cover in Elle magazine, and a 100,000 contract with CoverGirl cosmetics.

Contestants
(Ages stated are at start of contest)

Episodes

Return to the Runway
The Return to the Runway special aired on September 20, 2005, preceding the premiere of the fifth cycle. In this "Where are they now?" episode, we learned:

Appearing (in order)
Naima shot a premiere episode in season 2 of Veronica Mars.
Brittany is represented by NEXT Model Management.
Brita has signed with Ford Models and has her own billboard.
Keenyah has been seen in various ads and appeared on an episode of The Bold and the Beautiful.
Tiffany has been featured on the cover of an International Hair magazine and does community service as a teen counselor.
Lluvy is getting married and shot a bridal magazine cover.
Michelle is working on her body and has signed with Wilhelmina in New York.
Noelle is taking care of her son back home and plans to model.
Christina has walked runways for San Francisco fashion week.
Rebecca signed with VNY Model Management and has appeared in various magazines, including Cosmopolitan.
Brandy is continuing to meet with various agencies.
Kahlen is doing test shoots to expand her portfolio and began working in different fashion capitals in the world like Tokyo, Shanghai, Paris, and many more.
Tatiana has moved to New York.
Sarah has modeled in Paris and Tokyo. (No Appearance)

It also focused on the ANTM tour featuring:

Shannon Stewart, Mercedes Scelba-Shorte, Shandi Sullivan, Catie Anderson, Ann Markley, Norelle Van Herk, Eva Marcille, Amanda Swafford, Toccara Jones, Kahlen Rondot, Brittany Brower, Tiffany Richardson, Keenyah Hill, and Naima Mora.

Special guests: Naima Mora

Summaries

Call-out order

 The contestant was eliminated
 The contestant won the competition

Average  call-out order
Casting call-out order and final two are not included

Bottom two

 The contestant was eliminated after her first time in the bottom two
 The contestant was eliminated after her second time in the bottom two
 The contestant was eliminated after her third time in the bottom two
 The contestant was eliminated in the final judging and placed as the runner-up

Photo Shoot Guide
Episode 2 Photo Shoot: Aliens over Manhattan
Episode 3 Photo Shoot: 1-800-Flowers dog-walkers
Episode 4 Photo Shoot: Warneco calendar Zodiac Signs
Episode 5 Photo Shoot: Got Milk? campaign with different ethnicities
Episode 6 Photo Shoot: Gas attendants fighting the elements
Episode 7 Photo Shoot: Wonderbra pillow fight with a male model
Episode 8 Photo Shoot: 7 deadly sins
Episode 9 Photo Shoot: Animals for Lubriderm with a crocodile
Episode 10 Photo Shoot: Kloofing to get to shoot actual shoot was creating their own look using natural elements
Episode 11 Photo Shoot: Dancing with African Natives for Caress Body Wash
Episode 13 Photo Shoot & Commercial: CoverGirl Outlast Foundation ad

Other Cast Members
 Jay Manuel – Photo Director
 J. Alexander – Runway Coach
 Mathu Anderson – Make-Up Artist
 Danilo – Hairstylist

Makeovers
 Brita - The Princess Bride inspired tight waves
 Sarah - Peter Pan inspired cut and dyed dark brown
 Brandy - Weave removed, cut very short, dyed light red, and eyebrows bleached
 Noelle - Blown-out and straightened
 Lluvy - Trimmed and dyed red a la Shelley Duvall
Rebecca - Long curly brown weave with blonde highlights
 Tiffany - Long straight middle part black weave
 Tatiana - Paulina Porizkova inspired long dark brown hair
 Michelle - Dyed ice blonde
 Christina - Dyed dark brown
 Brittany - Trimmed with heavy bangs
 Keenyah - Asymmetrical blunt bob cut a la Vidal Sassoon; later, wavy weave
 Kahlen - Carmen Kass inspired long blonde weave 
 Naima - Dyed honey blonde

Criticism

The show was criticized for its handling of sexual assault allegations from Keenyah, who was sexually harassed by a male model on a photo shoot. The show has been criticized for not doing anything when the model stroked her inner thigh, moaned in her ear, took photos of her and harassed her repeatedly for her phone number.

Post–Top Model careers

Brittany Brower has done a few campaigns and been featured on a few TV programs, including Bravo's Battle of the Network Reality Stars. She also works for NEXT Models now in L.A. In addition, Brower participated America's Next Top Model, Cycle 17, which is an all-star edition along with other returning models and was placed 14th, first to be eliminated.
Sarah Dankelman has not pursued modeling actively but has been featured in Stuff.
Tatiana Dante has done Hawaii-based print work.
Michelle Deighton has tried out for the Janice Dickinson Modeling Agency. Later she married Jon Dalton, and gave birth to a baby girl. She has modeled for Elate wear, Louche Clothing, Celebrity Baby Blog, Mommygoround.com, and has appeared in Life & Style Magazine. She was a contestant on WWE Tough Enough, where she quit.
Rebecca Epley has done some modeling. She signed with VNY Model Management and has appeared in various magazines, including Cosmopolitan.
Lluvy Gomez has done some print work including a bridal shot.
Keenyah Hill has done some spreads in magazines and runway shows and has signed to I Model and Talent in New York
Naima Mora collected all her prizes and is signed with Basic Model Management and 301 Model Management. She has received a show card in fashion week SS09 and walked in Project Runway. She has also modeled for various magazines and is lead vocalist for the band Chewing Pics.
Christina Murphy did some print work for various clothing companies. She was also signed with Passport Model Agency.
Brita Petersons has done some advertising work, including a billboard. She has signed with Ford Models in Los Angeles and Vue Model Management.
Tiffany Richardson had a cover of International Hair and has done few test shots, but after has not continued to model. She is now mentoring troubled teenagers and taking care of her son.
Kahlen Rondot has done some ANTM-related promotional work. She was the face of Jay Manuel's cosmetic line but has since quit the industry and now works as a bartender.
Brandy Rusher has done test shots.
Noelle Staggers has done test shots.

References

External links 
 

A04
2005 American television seasons
Television shows filmed in California
Television shows filmed in South Africa